Yalamanchili Veeranjaneyulu served as the Member of the Legislative Assembly for Sattenapalli constituency in Andhra Pradesh, India, between 1999 and 2004. They represented the Telugu Desam Party.

References

Andhra Pradesh MLAs 1999–2004
Telugu Desam Party politicians
People from Guntur district
Telugu politicians
Year of birth missing
Possibly living people